Denny Herzig (born 13 November 1984) is a German former professional footballer who played as a centre-back.

Career
Having played as a youth for SV Sparneck, FC Bayern Hof and Carl Zeiss Jena, Herzig moved to England aged 16, joining Wimbledon along with his older brother Nico. After a year in the Dons' youth system, he moved north, signing for Blackpool, but he was unable to break into the first team, and in 2004 he returned to Germany, reuniting with his brother at SV Wacker Burghausen.

Burghausen were in the 2. Bundesliga, and Herzig made his professional debut in October 2004, replacing Macchambes Younga-Mouhani in a 2–0 victory over SpVgg Unterhaching. This was his only appearance of the season, and after two more appearances the following year, he was released in June 2006. He spent three years playing for SV Elversberg in the Regionalliga Süd, before joining Rot-Weiss Essen in 2009. He served as club captain, but left the club after one season, as the club declared insolvency and were forced to withdraw from the Regionalliga West.

In 2010, Herzig joined Dynamo Dresden of the 3. Liga. He made seventeen appearances in the 2010–11 season as the club earned promotion to the 2. Bundesliga, but he was released at the end of the season and signed for Eintracht Trier in July 2011. Again he was released after one season, and spent three months without a club before signing for Bayer Leverkusen II in October 2012. He was released by Leverkusen at the end of the 2012–13 season. He then had a short stint in Iceland with Víkingur Ólafsvík in 2014, before returning to Germany to play for SV Seligenporten in 2015. He ended his career with FC Pipinsried where he played between 2015 and 2018.

Personal life
Herzig's older brother, Nico, was also a professional footballer.

In 2015, while playing football on amateur level, Herzig became a police officer with the Munich Police Department.

Career statistics

References

External links
 

1984 births
Living people
People from Pößneck
People from Bezirk Gera
German footballers
Association football midfielders
Footballers from Thuringia
Wimbledon F.C. players
Blackpool F.C. players
SV Wacker Burghausen players
SV Elversberg players
Rot-Weiss Essen players
Dynamo Dresden players
SV Eintracht Trier 05 players
Bayer 04 Leverkusen II players
Ungmennafélagið Víkingur players
FC Pipinsried players
2. Bundesliga players
3. Liga players
1. deild karla players
NOFV-Oberliga players
Oberliga (football) players
Regionalliga players
German expatriate footballers
German expatriate sportspeople in England
Expatriate footballers in England
German expatriate sportspeople in Iceland
Expatriate footballers in Iceland
German police officers